Some Blondes Are Dangerous is a 1937 American drama film directed by Milton Carruth and written by Lester Cole. It is based on the 1930 novel Iron Man by W. R. Burnett. The film stars Noah Beery Jr., William Gargan, Nan Grey, Dorothea Kent, Roland Drew, Lew Kelly, Polly Rowles and John Butler. The film was released on November 1, 1937, by Universal Pictures.

Plot
A boxer hooks up with a suspicious blonde even though he is advised not to.

Cast

Production
This picture is one of very few in which Noah Beery Jr., nephew of Wallace Beery, is top-billed as the lead rather than a supporting player. Along with almost countless other roles across the decades, Noah Beery Jr. later played James Garner's character's father "Rocky" in the 1970s television series The Rockford Files.

References

External links
 

1937 films
American drama films
1937 drama films
Universal Pictures films
American black-and-white films
Films directed by Milton Carruth
1930s English-language films
1930s American films